The following is a list of recurring Saturday Night Live (SNL) characters and sketches introduced between September 28, 1991, and May 16, 1992, the seventeenth season of SNL.

Tales From The Barbecue
An old man (Tim Meadows) tells outlandish tales of acts of barbecue-related heroism he performed when he was younger (Chris Rock). Debuted September 28, 1991.

Zoraida the NBC Page
An Ellen Cleghorne sketch. Debuted September 28, 1991.

Appearances

The Chris Farley Show

A Chris Farley sketch. Debuted October 5, 1991.

Appearances

Queen Shenequa
Queen Shenequa, played by Ellen Cleghorne, was an Afrocentric social critic who dressed in African garb, observed Kwanzaa, and made commentaries on race. She had a somewhat disdainful persona, such as when she observed about Michael Jackson: "'Black or White'? If it doesn't matter, then why are you so white?", or when she commented that Kwanzaa "is a Swahili word which means 'Santa don't come to my house'". Debuted October 26, 1991.

Appearances

Mark Strobel
A Chris Farley sketch. Debuted November 2, 1991.

Unfrozen Caveman Lawyer

Phil Hartman plays a caveman who was frozen in a glacier, was revived in modern times, and went on to become a corrupt lawyer. Debuted November 23, 1991.

Appearances

Dick Clark's Receptionist
A David Spade sketch in which various celebrities show up for a meeting with Dick Clark, and his receptionist doesn't recognize them ("And you are ... ?"). Debuted December 7, 1991.

Appearances

Theatre Stories
Theatre Stories was an SNL skit parodying English actors. Debuted December 14, 1991. It is described by the announcer as produced by the "British-American Theatre Alliance", and centered around  several English Shakespearean actors recounting acting experiences and anecdotes. However, one of the most memorable performances was Dana Carvey as embittered former American child star Mickey Rooney, complaining about how the film industry largely turned their back on him, and reminiscing on better times.

Mike Myers played the host, Kenneth Rhys-Evans (aka "Cucumber Jones"), an English actor who discovered one day that he could not control the volume of his voice (a joke Myers later used in the first Austin Powers movie). Other characters included Steve Martin as an elderly British actor nicknamed "Nobby", because his real name was incredibly long.

Quotes:

Kenneth: That reminds me of a story that's in no way related. I was working with John Gielgud in a production of Troilus and Cressida, when I discovered I had no control OVER THE VOLUME OF MY VOICE!
Mickey: I was the number one star... in the world, you hear me? Bang! <kissing noise> In the wooorld.
Nobby: What a fascinating story you ghastly American! <imitating Mickey> Bang!"Mickey: I'm just glad I like women.Nobby: What are you getting at?Kenneth: Yes, why don't you go off somewhere and have an American 'hot... dog'?
Nobby: I remember one time when we were doing a performance of Waiting for Godot during the war when we took a direct hit from a Nazi buzz bomb, and when I looked up and saw the proscenium crashing down on me I said "Ah" and I soiled myself.Kenneth: Well who can blame you? I would too if I were in that situation.Nobby: No, not then, I mean right now when I said "Ah"!

Appearances

Jan Brady
The middle sister from The Brady Bunch, she was portrayed by Melanie Hutsell, who had first played the character in The Real Live Brady Bunch stage show. She would usually begin a commentary on a subject which devolved into a comparison to something that happened on one of the Brady Bunch episodes and her frustration with her siblings who get more attention. Her catchphrase was "Marcia, Marcia, MARCIA!", referring to her older sister in a direct quote from an episode of the popular TV series. Debuted January 11, 1992.

Appearances

Delta Delta Delta
A Melanie Hutsell, Siobhan Fallon Hogan and Beth Cahill sketch, parodying the sorority Delta Delta Delta. Sometimes the characters would be visited by fraternity members, played by male cast members or guests. The catchphrases were stating "Oh mah Gawd" or answering a phone with "Delta, Delta, Delta, can I help ya, help ya, help ya?" In one crossover, one of the Tri-Delts got poor customer service from the Gap Girls. Debuted January 11, 1992.

Appearances

Cajun Man
Adam Sandler portrayed a man from Cajun country in Louisiana who dressed like Huckleberry Finn and spoke in a heavily exaggerated Cajun French dialect. When interviewed he would simply respond with one or two word answers, ending with "-tion". For example, when asked where his girlfriend is, he would answer "long vacation" and then being asked how he occupies his time, would answer "masturbation." The character is essentially a send-up of TV chef Justin Wilson who specialized in Cajun cuisine, and would frequently enunciate the second syllable in the word "onion". Debuted February 8, 1992.

Appearances

The Sensitive Naked Man
A Rob Schneider sketch, where Schneider plays a nudist who fails to see the stigma of public nudity. The sketch was shown twice, once with his wife tries to confront him about his nudity at home, another where he is at a ball game with his son. He is sensitive to people's problems, but denies any connection to complaints about his refusal to put some clothes on, not even to the point in the second sketch where he is arrested for indecent exposure. The sketch was discontinued, arguably because of risk of censorship violations. Schneider actually was naked on set. Although he concealed himself such as being behind counters and the like, there were a couple of times his naked rear end was visible to the audience. Debuted February 8, 1992. The second sketch was on May 16, 1992.

Buster Jenkins
A Chris Rock sketch, where he was a Weekend Update commentator giving a story from the perspective of an elderly black man. Debuted February 15, 1992.

Susan the Transsexual
A Phil Hartman sketch. Debuted February 15, 1992.

Opera Man
Opera Man was a Weekend Update character played in the early to middle 1990s by Adam Sandler. He would appear in a fancy shirt and black cape - often holding a white handkerchief as a parody of Pavarotti - and sing, opera style, jokes about current events and celebrities. Among Opera Man's sketches, regarding the L.A. Riots:  "La Chiefa Policia, no dispatcha gendarme / morono, no respondo / no excusa, bagga doucha!"
There was also the "Tom Hanks-o/ nominat-o/second time-o/You're a great-o/next year vacacion/go to France-o/give someone else/ a freaking chance-o!" sketch, during which, on the screen, a picture of Billy Madison came up. The sketches always ended with a big flourish. For example: "I like to sing for you!/ a-that's a-no lie/ Opera man, Bye Bye!" concluding with mock-bravos and roses being flung in Opera Man's direction. Debuted April 18, 1992.

The earlier appearances of Opera Man featured him singing a higher quantity of accurate Italian lyrics, though the subtitles showed the lyrics rather than an English translation. Jon Lovitz showed up in one episode to play his older brother just in from Italy.

Opera Man also once appeared in his own sketch where it was done up like a genuine opera (albeit a very short one), and titled "One Match Short of the Jackpot". Phil Hartman narrates, explaining to the audience that Opera Man has just filled up his car at a gas station and included a New Hampshire Lottery scratch ticket with his purchase. Opera Man gets more excited as every box he scratches off reveal a million dollar prize, until the last one, at which he prays to God, "Opera Man promiso--no more masturbato!" mismatches and he dejectedly says he must continue his job as a security guard for Montgomery Ward. Sandler briefly reprised Opera Man on SNLs 40th anniversary show in 2015.

Opera Man also performed at the 2001 Concert for New York City.

Appearances

References

Lists of recurring Saturday Night Live characters and sketches
Saturday Night Live in the 1990s
Saturday Night Live
Saturday Night Live